David Steward Baxter (born 7 February 1955) has been a member of the First Quorum of the Seventy of the Church of Jesus Christ of Latter-day Saints (LDS Church) since 2006.  A native of Scotland, and a resident of England at the time of his call, he is only the third general authority who was native to the United Kingdom and also living there at the time of his call.

Early life and biography
Baxter's parents divorced when he was five years old and his mother remarried twice in his childhood. During his youth, Baxter was taken from his home by the state on more than one occasion. Baxter joined the LDS Church, along with his mother and siblings when he was 12 and shortly after this the family moved to Surrey. This is where Baxter first met his future wife, Diana Lewars. They were in the same ward and were two of only five Latter-day Saints at their school.  Baxter then attended the University of Wales where he graduated with a BSc in economics.

After graduating, Baxter served a mission in the Scotland Edinburgh Mission, starting in 1976. For 10 months of this mission he was branch president in Lerwick in the Shetland Islands.

Baxter served for a time as a senior director at British Telecom. He also served as the UK Government's Director for International Trade & Investment for Greater London and as a member of the Board of Capacity Builders, a UK Home Office Agency.  He previously served as chairman of the Board of Business Link for London (small business advice service), and as a member of the Board of London First, on the CBI London Council, and as Deputy Chairman of the East Anglian Ambulance NHS Trust.

LDS Church service
Baxter was called as an bishop at age 25.  He later served as a counselor in a stake presidency, as president of the Ipswich England Stake and as a counselor in the presidency of the England London Mission.  From 2002 to 2006 he was an area seventy, which included serving as a counselor in the presidency of the church's Europe West Area from 2004 to 2006. After his call as general authority, Baxter served as a counselor in the church's New Zealand/Pacific Islands Area and then as president of the Pacific Area, each based in Auckland, New Zealand. In 2012, he addressed the church's general conference and focused on single parents, "Please never feel that you are in some kind of second-tier, subcategory of church membership, somehow less entitled to the Lord's blessings than others. In the kingdom of God, there are no second-class citizens.".

In 2009, Baxter was diagnosed with brain cancer after suffering a seizure while touring a mission in Australia. He underwent brain surgery and radiation therapy for the treatment of this illness. As a result, he was released from the area presidency, returned to Salt Lake for medical treatment, and was placed on medical leave from his assignments. Following some treatment and recovery, he resumed service at church headquarters, but has since again been placed on medical leave.

Personal life
After returning from his mission, Baxter and his wife were married and they are the parents of four children. Dianne passed away on March 25, 2022, at the age of 66.

Bibliography
A Perfect Brightness of Hope by David S. Baxter (Deseret Book, 30 April 2012)
Peace, be Still by David S. Baxter (Cedar Fort, 8 October 2013)
What Good Men Do by David S. Baxter (Cedar Fort, 14 October 2014)

References

External links
David S. Baxter: Latter-day Saint official profile
"New Area Authority Seventies" Church News, April 20, 2002. Retrieved 15 September 2014.
 Sarah Jane Weaver, "Londoners strong after terrorists strike", Church News July 16, 2005. Retrieved 15 September 2014.
 Shaun D. Stahle, "Peace came when the missionaries visited", Church News, April 15, 2006. Retrieved 15 September 2014. See also "David S. Baxter" from the same Church News edition for Baxter's biographical information.
"Greeting prime minister", Church News, 17 February 2007. Retrieved 15 September 2014.
"New Zealand leader promotes education", Church News, 24 November 2007. Retrieved 15 September 2014.

1955 births
Alumni of the University of Wales
Area seventies (LDS Church)
Converts to Mormonism
Living people
British Telecom people
Members of the First Quorum of the Seventy (LDS Church)
Mission presidents (LDS Church)
Mormon missionaries in England
Scottish Latter Day Saints
Scottish Mormon missionaries
20th-century Mormon missionaries
Mormon missionaries in Scotland
Scottish general authorities (LDS Church)